Hawk Point Township is an inactive township in Lincoln County, in the U.S. state of Missouri.

Hawk Point Township took its name from the community of Hawk Point, Missouri.

References

Townships in Missouri
Townships in Lincoln County, Missouri